List of models who have starred in music videos of different singers and musical groups.

References 

Lists of models
Music videos
Music-related lists